Tal Dosr al-Mallohi (alternately, al-Mallouhi) born January 4, 1991 is a Syrian blogger from Homs. In December 2009, Tal was taken from her home by Syrian forces, which took issue with the contents of her blog (specifically some of the poems she wrote about Palestine, alongside other social commentary).

Tal al-Mallohi was accused by the Syrian government of being a spy for the United States of America, and sentenced on February 15, 2011 to five years in prison. During her ordeal, she was called "the youngest prisoner of conscience in the Arab world".

Detention of Tal al-Mallohi
According to various reports issued by human rights organizations, al-Mallohi was arrested by the general security directorate in Damascus on December 27, 2009. The following day, authorities from the Syrian security forces invaded her home—seizing several items, which included her personal computer, along with various books and CDs.

Tal's parents allege that Syrian forces wouldn't relay pertinent information about her alleged crimes, nor were they made aware of where she was being detained.

In September 2010, almost a year after her arrest, Tal's mother, Ahed Mallohi (Ahed al-Mallohi), wrote a letter that appealed to the Syrian President Bashar al-Assad himself, asking him to intervene and order the release of her daughter. She emphasized that al-Mallohi had no links to "any organizations in Syria, opposition or otherwise." She further reminded al-Assad that the girl's grandfather, Mohammad Dia al-Mallohi, worked under late president Hafez al-Assad—apparently serving as Minister of State for the People's Assembly.

Ultimately, the mother alleges that she was promised by "one of the security authorities" that her daughter would be released before the month of Ramadan. However, the month ended without this promise being realized. Unfortunately, rumors began to surface—suggesting that Tal was being tortured, which was refuted by Syrian activists at the time.

On 20 September 2010, DP News—a website known for its close ties to the government—published a brief article, which alleged that Tal Mallohi was being held at a correctional facility 20 km northwest of Damascus. Referred to in the report as Duma Women's Prison, sources alleged that the 19-year-old was held on suspicions of espionage. On September 22, Ahed al-Mallohi, in a phone call with the Director of the Syrian Observatory for Human Rights, objected to this story. She asserted that she had visited the prison many times, but personnel always told her that her daughter had not been transferred there.

Protests Against the Detention of Tal al-Mallohi

The arrest prompted waves of criticism and condemnation by bloggers and Human Rights activists throughout the world. Arab bloggers published attacks on what is considered repressive random arrests in Syria. Since the Syrian government—a regime known for prohibiting political opposition and human rights activism  —enacted emergency laws when the Baath Party took power in 1963, they were not obligated to issue an official response to the inquiries into Tal's whereabouts. The Syrian government has made it its policy to not comment on political arrests.

Egyptian human rights activists on September 12, 2010 issued an invitation to organize a protest held in front of the Syrian Embassy in Cairo on September 19, 2010. Protesters pleaded to know her whereabouts, whilst demanding her immediate release. The organization Reporters without Borders was also called upon to pressure the Syrian government to put an immediate end to her captivity.

Similarly, Human Rights Watch demanded the release of Tal al-Mallohi. "Detaining a high school student for nine months without charge is typical of the cruel, arbitrary behavior of Syria's security services," said Sarah Leah Whitson, Middle East director at Human Rights Watch.

Amnesty International said that the detention of al-Mallohi is a "mystery" for the organization, adding that "the case of this student raises many questions, there is no clear reason for her arrest, and isolation from the world in this way". She also said that Amnesty International believes that Al-Mallohi is a prisoner of conscience, and the Syrian government imprisoned her solely because she exercised her right to express her thoughts and aspirations in a peaceful manner. Also noting that Tal is exposed to risk of torture and other types of abuse.

Protests have taken place around the world in: Cairo, Pakistan, Germany, France, Washington D.C. and others.  In addition to these protests, the first Syrian Virtual Protest took place on October 2, 2010, for the Freedom of Tal al-Mallohi.

Earlier Arrests of Syrian Bloggers

The case of al-Mallohi is not the first of its kind. Hundreds, if not thousands, of Syrians have been arrested due to their blogging, political activism or expressing their views. Many of whom were sentenced to long prison terms.

Reporters without borders reported that a number of at least four influential Syrian internet activists have been behind bars in the year of 2009, making Syria classified among more than 12 countries as "enemies of the Internet" by the report. Syrian authorities also banned an estimated two hundred website, including Facebook, YouTube and even Wikipedia, but the Syrians citizens and human rights activists, and most users have found ways to get around the bans.

Blogs of Tal al-Mallohi 
Tal al-Mallohi published her writings in three blogs, one of which is listed under the name "My Blog"  and is most likely that she has been  arrested due to an article or articles published on this blog specifically. Publications on "My blog" consisted of poems and articles in support of the Palestinian cause and critical of the Union for the Mediterranean, which is  a diplomatic union pushed by France, between Arab and European states as well as Israel. A picture of Gandhi is published with "will always remain an example" written above it. Many pictures of Sheikh Raed Salah, and the sons of Mahmoud al-Zahar, "martyrs" and pictures of Tayseer Erdogan, with the words "Thank Venezuela", and an image of George W. Bush's face on the body of Adolf Hitler. The background image says "No to torture."
Tal's last post was on September 6 of 2009 which was a poem entitled "Jerusalem, Our Lady of the cities".

The second is the blog titled "Letters" (written by Tal "English Latters") and the first "message" posted on this blog was entitled "The First message to man in this world" dated January 19, 2009.

Tal's third blog is titled "The destroyed Palestinian villages" and the latest blog entries from the village of Deir Qaddis dated May 3, 2009.

See also

Human Rights in Syria
Emergency Law

References

External links
 Mudawanati - Tal Mallohi's blog
 Latters - Tal Mallohi's blog
 Palestine Villages - Tal Mallohi's blog

1991 births
Amnesty International prisoners of conscience held by Syria
Living people
People from Homs
People of the Syrian civil war
Syrian bloggers
Syrian women bloggers
Syrian prisoners and detainees
Articles containing video clips